Benigno Repeki Fitial (born November 27, 1945) is a Northern Marianan politician who served was the seventh governor of the Northern Mariana Islands. The second longest-serving governor in CNMI history, Fitial was elected on November 6, 2005, assumed office on January 9, 2006, and was re-elected to a (five-year) second term in 2009. He was impeached by the CNMI House of Representatives on February 11, 2013, and was scheduled to face trial before the CNMI Senate to determine if he should be removed from office. He resigned on February 20, 2013, after 7 years, 1 month, and 11 days in office.

Fitial founded the Covenant Party in 2001 after leaving the Republican Party. He rejoined the Republican Party on January 5, 2011, announcing that his goal would be to merge the Covenant Party back into the Republican Party.

Fitial was the first governor in any US territory or commonwealth to be impeached and only the 13th governor in the history of the United States. On February 11 & 12, 2013 the CNMI House of Representatives voted to impeach Fitial on 18 different charges contained in Articles of Impeachment. The charges include neglect of duties, commission of felonies and abuse of power.

Rather than facing an impeachment trial before the CNMI Senate which was set for March 7, 2013, Benigno Repeki Fitial became the first governor in CNMI history to resign from office on February 20, 2013. In his resignation letter he cited "personal health" reasons and the "best interests of the Commonwealth".

Personal life
Born on November 27, 1945, and raised in a Satawalese family, Fitial graduated from high school with honors at Saipan's Mt. Carmel School in 1964. He obtained a Bachelor of Business Administration with an emphasis on business management from the University of Guam.  He is recognized as a University of Guam Distinguished Alumni.

Fitial is the first elected governor of Carolinian descent in the Commonwealth of the Northern Mariana Islands (CNMI). Carolinians are indigenous to the Caroline Islands, and the ancestors of most Carolinians now living in the northern Mariana Islands immigrated there in the early 19th century, from the Yap and Chuuk island groups of what is now the Federated States of Micronesia. The Chamorro are the indigenous inhabitants of the Marianas, and past winners of gubernatorial elections in the CNMI had been Chamorro.

The former Governor is married to Josie Fitial (née Padiermos), a Filipino who as a contract worker in 1983 moved to the CNMI, where Filipinos outnumber residents of all Pacific Islander ethnicities combined.    Padiermos, like many Filipinos, moved abroad for employment to send financial support to family members still in the Philippines. The couple met while she was working as a waitress on Saipan. They have two children together, Patrick and Christina, in addition to Benigno Fitial's four children from a previous marriage, Jason, Cathy, Junella and Julie.

Fitial has described himself in the past as a "good friend" of convicted U.S. lobbyist Jack Abramoff, who caused some controversy in both the Commonwealth and Washington. As vice president of Tan Holdings, Fitial worked closely with Abramoff, who had the family textile conglomerate as a consistent client.

Fitial and his wife are residents of Gualo Rai, Saipan.

Political career
Fitial worked as a budget analyst for the government of the former Trust Territory of the Pacific Islands. He also worked as a former executive for Tan Holdings Corporation, which was the largest garment manufacturer in the Northern Mariana Islands at the time.

Fitial is a former member of the Republican Party, and served as the chairman of the Republican Party in the CNMI.

Fitial left the Republican Party, and founded his own political party, the Covenant Party in 2001. He used the Covenant Party as a vehicle to run for Governor of the Northern Mariana Islands in the 2001 gubernatorial election with his running mate, then-Education Commissioner Rita Inos. However, Fitial was defeated in a landslide by the Republican ticket of Juan N. Babauta and his running mate, Diego Benavente. The Babauta-Benavente ticket received 5,512 votes, the largest number of votes ever received by a gubernatorial candidate in history to date.

In 2003, Fitial was elected to the Northern Mariana Islands House of Representatives in the 2003 midterm election. Candidates from his Covenant Party were also elected, giving the party the majority in the House of Representatives. Fitial was further elected the Speaker by the House in 2003, replacing Republican Speaker Heinz Hofschneider. He represented Precinct 3, which includes parts of Saipan and the northern islands.

Governorship
Fitial was the seventh governor of the Commonwealth of the Northern Mariana Islands (CNMI). He defeated independent candidate Heinz Hofschneider and incumbent Republican Governor Juan N. Babauta during the 2005 gubernatorial election with 28.1 percent of the total vote after absentee ballots were counted.  The 2005 gubernatorial election margin of victory of 84 votes was the closest in the history of the Commonwealth. Fitial and his running mate, Lieutenant Governor Timothy P. Villagomez were sworn into office on January 9, 2006.

He implemented a dress code of business attire for all cabinet members shortly after his inauguration.

Fitial faced challenges during his first term as governor, including budget shortfalls, a weak economy even before the Financial crisis of 2007–2010, declining Japanese tourism, electrical power generation failures, and the long-proposed federalization of CNMI immigration that was eventually enacted. Pub.L. 110–229, tit. VII (May 8, 2008). Fitial appointed as his Special Legal Counsel Howard P. Willens, who had represented the Marianas Political Status Commission from 1972 to 1975 in negotiating the Covenant to Establish a Commonwealth of the Northern Mariana Islands in Political Union with the United States of America, Act of Mar. 24, 1976, Pub. L. 94-241, 90 Stat. 263, codified as amended at 48 U.S.C. § 1801 note. 
 
Some observers and local publications (such as the Marianas Variety) accused Fitial of concentrating power in his office. This included a decision made to abolish the autonomy of at least two government agencies, with their functions being transferred to the executive. The governor and his supporters asserted that drastic measures need to be taken to cut excessive government spending during the tenure of the previous governor, Juan Babauta.

Fitial was away from office for several weeks in late 2006 when he underwent successful surgery at UCLA Medical Center in Los Angeles on October 31 to correct spinal stenosis.

Lieutenant Governor Timothy Villagomez resigned from office on April 24, 2009, following his conviction on federal criminal charges related to fraud while he was a member of the CNMI House of Representatives. Villagomez became the highest ranking CNMI official ever to be convicted in a criminal trial.

Under the Northern Mariana Islands Commonwealth Constitution, when a Lieutenant Governor vacancy occurs, the governor appoints a successor with the "advice and consent" of the Northern Mariana Islands Senate. Governor Fitial nominated the CNMI Secretary of Finance Eloy Inos to fill the Lieutenant Governor vacancy on April 27, 2009. Fitial and Inos had first met years earlier while both were working for the government of the now defunct Trust Territory of the Pacific Islands. Fitial was working as a budget analyst, while Inos was employed as a tax manager for the Trust Territory's revenue division at the time. Inos was unanimously confirmed in a vote by all 9 members of the Senate on Friday, May 1, 2009. Inos was sworn into office by Governor Fitial shortly after the Senate vote, becoming the Northern Mariana Islands first unelected Lieutenant Governor.

A minority bloc in the Commonwealth of the Northern Mariana Islands' House of Representatives filed an impeachment resolution August 28, 2012 against Governor Fitial, who was at that time in the United States for the Republican National Convention.  The resolution was filed by Joseph Deleon Guerrero, a former Republican who left the party and became an independent.  It accused the governor of "multiple felonies, multiple acts of public corruption" and of neglecting official duties. 
All charges were eventually dismissed.

2009 Gubernatorial re-election campaign

Governor Benigno Fitial announced in March 2009 that he would seek re-election to a second term in November.

On June 12, 2009, Fitial presided over Covenant Party midterm rally in Susupe with an estimated crowd of approximately 3,000 people in attendance.
Fitial and Inos officially filed to run for re-election with the CNMI Election Commission on July 23, 2009, in the presence of nearly 200 family and supporters. In the November 2009 gubernatorial election, Fitial was challenged by the Republican nominee, Heinz Hofschneider, as well as independent candidates Juan Pan Guerrero and Ramon "Kumoi" Guerrero. In March 2009, Fitial had publicly stated that he will retire from politics if his re-election bid was unsuccessful.
In the general election, Hofschneider led Fitial by just 8 votes; because none of the candidates won a majority, a runoff between Hofschneider and Fitial was triggered. Fitial won the runoff by 370 votes and therefore was re-elected. Due to a newly ratified legislative initiative, Fitial was expected to serve a five-year term, as the next gubernatorial election would now be held in 2014.

Impeachment
Fitial became the first governor in any US insular area and the 13th in the history of the nation to be impeached (February 11, 2013). The CNMI House of Representatives pre-filed 18 Articles of Impeachment against Fitial on the day of their Inauguration (January 14, 2013). They voted to adopt 13 of the Articles of Impeachment on February 11, 2013, and adopted the remaining 5 Articles of Impeachment on February 12, 2013. All 18 charges were transmitted to the Senate where Fitial would have stood trial had he not resigned.

House Votes:  

"No" votes: Minority leader George Camacho (R-Saipan), Reps. Felicidad Ogumoro (R-Saipan), Teresita Santos (R-Rota), and Richard Seman (R-Saipan) === except for Article 10 - Rep. George Camacho abstained due to conflict.

“Yes” votes: House Speaker Joseph Deleon Guerrero (IR-Saipan), Vice Speaker Frank Dela Cruz (IR-Saipan), floor leader Ralph Demapan (Cov-Saipan), Reps. Antonio Agulto (IR-Saipan), Anthony Benavente (IR-Saipan), Roman Benavente (IR-Saipan), Trenton Conner (Ind-Tinian), Lorenzo Deleon Guerrero (IR-Saipan), Cris Leon Guerrero (Cov-Saipan), Janet Maratita (IR-Saipan), John P. Sablan (Cov-Saipan), Tony Sablan (IR-Saipan), Mario Taitano (IR-Saipan), Ray Tebuteb (IR-Saipan), Edmund Villagomez (Cov-Saipan), and Ralph Yumul (IR-Saipan) === except for Article 15 - Rep. Roman Benavente abstained unknown reasons.

Career prior to governorship
Government:
Speaker of the House of Representatives, 3rd, 12th, & 14th NMI Legislature
Vice Speaker, 5th NMI Legislature
Minority Leader, 2nd and 4th NMI Legislature
Chief Administrative Officer, 1st NMI Legislature
Budget Officer, 1st NMI Legislature
Budget Analyst, Trust Territory Government
News Director, KJQR Radio Station
Business:
President, Bank of Saipan
Vice President, Tan Holdings Corporation
Special Consultant, L&T Corporation
President, Century Insurance Corporation
President, Century Travel Corporation
President, Consolidated Transportation Services Inc. (CTSI)
President, Pacific Oriental Inc. (POI)
President, Home Improvement (MPI)
Politics & Civic Contributions:
Founder, CNMI Covenant Party
Chairman, Northern Marianas Republican Party
Chairman, Bush for President Committee for the CNMI
Chairman, CNMI Zoning Board
Chairman, NMI Trusteeship Termination Task Force
Chairman, 1st CNMI Civil Service Commission
Chairman, Saipan Municipal Scholarship Board
Member, CNMI Tax Task Force
Member, Republican Presidential Task Force (US)
Delegate, 1st Northern Marianas Constitutional Convention
Chairman, Constitutional Convention Committee(s) on Tax, Public Debt, Education, & Local Government

See also 
 List of minority governors and lieutenant governors in the United States

References

External links
Office of the Governor, Commonwealth of the Northern Mariana Islands
Biography of Gov. Benigno R. Fitial
Pacific Magazine: "The Business Governors": The Inauguration of Gov. Benigno Fitial and Lt. Gov. Timothy Villagomez
Covenant Party Site

1945 births
Covenant Party (Northern Mariana Islands) politicians
Governors of the Northern Mariana Islands
Impeached state and territorial governors of the United States
Living people
Northern Mariana Islands businesspeople
Northern Mariana Islands people of Carolinian descent
People from Saipan
Republican Party (Northern Mariana Islands) politicians
Republican Party governors of the Northern Mariana Islands
University of Guam alumni
Speakers of the Northern Mariana Islands House of Representatives